Luther is a 1928 German film about the life of Martin Luther, father of the Protestant Reformation.

The silent film starred Eugen Klöpfer as Luther and Theodor Loos as Philipp Melanchthon, and was written by Berlin Cathedral chaplain Bruno Doehring.

It was shot at the Babelsberg Studios in Berlin. The film's sets were designed by the art directors Robert Herlth, Walter Röhrig and Werner Schlichting. It premiered at the UFA-Palast am Zoo.

Cast
Eugen Klöpfer as Martin Luther 
Rudolf Lettinger as Luther's father
Elsa Wagner as Luther's mother  
Livio Pavanelli as Luther's friend Alexius 
Arthur Kraußneck as Staupitz 
Karl Platen as Brother Franziskus 
Theodor Loos as Melanchthon 
Hermann Vallentin as Karlstadt 
Karl Elzer as Friedrich the Wise 
Werner Schott as Johann the Steadfast
Ferdinand von Alten as Miltitz 
Bruno Kastner as Ulrich von Hutten 
Leopold von Ledebur as Sickingen   
Ernst Rückert as Imperial Herald Caspar Sturm 
Georg Schmieter as Georg von Frundsberg
Max Maximilian as Hans Sachs
Max Grünberg as Albrecht Dürer
Jakob Tiedtke as Tetzel
Hans Wassmann as Robber Baron
Alexander Murski as the printer Hans Lufft
Heinz Salfner as Palace Captain Berlepsch
Hans Carl Müller as Charles V, Holy Roman Emperor
Max Schreck as  Aleander
Georg John as Cripple (disabled man)

External links

1928 films
Films of the Weimar Republic
German silent feature films
German black-and-white films
Films about Martin Luther
Films shot at Babelsberg Studios
German historical films
1920s historical films
Silent horror films
1920s German films